Jalen Rasheed Smith (born March 16, 2000) is an American professional basketball player who plays for the Indiana Pacers of the National Basketball Association (NBA). Nicknamed "Stix", he played college basketball for the Maryland Terrapins.

Smith was picked 10th overall in the 2020 NBA draft by the Phoenix Suns. During his rookie season with the Suns, he reached the NBA Finals. In February 2022, he was traded to the Pacers.

Early life and high school career
Smith was born in Portsmouth, Virginia to Charles and Orletha Smith. He has a sister named Kiara Smith. Smith attended Mount Saint Joseph High School in Baltimore, Maryland where he averaged 22.2 points, 12.0 rebounds, and 4.0  blocks per game as a senior and won several awards, among them, the Gatorade Maryland Boys Basketball Player of the Year twice. He was named to the 2018 McDonald's All-American team.

Recruiting
Smith was ranked among the top 25 prospects of the 2018 recruiting class by Rivals, 247Sports, and ESPN. He was also ranked as one of the top prospects at his position by all three scouting services.

College career

On November 8, 2017, Smith signed his National Letter of Intent to play for Maryland after verbally committing in June. He selected Maryland over programs such as Villanova and Virginia. As a freshman, he averaged 11.7 points, 6.8 rebounds and 1.2 blocks per game. He had 19 points and 12 rebounds in a 79–77 win over Belmont in the Round of 64 of the NCAA Tournament. In the next game, a 69–67 loss to LSU, Smith finished with 15 points, eight rebounds and a career-high five blocks.

On December 4, 2019, Smith finished with 15 points and a career-high 16 rebounds in a 72–51 win against Notre Dame. On January 21, 2020, Smith scored a career-high 25 points and had 11 rebounds in a come-from-behind 77–66 win over Northwestern. At the close of the regular season, Smith was named to the First Team All-Big Ten by the coaches and media and the Defensive Team by the coaches. He was named Third Team All-American by the Associated Press and Sporting News. He averaged 15.5 points, 10.5 rebounds, and 2.4 blocks per game as a sophomore. After the season, Smith declared for the 2020 NBA draft.

Professional career

Phoenix Suns (2020–2022)
Smith was selected by the Phoenix Suns as the 10th pick of the first round of the 2020 NBA draft. On November 24, 2020, the Phoenix Suns announced that they had signed Smith. On February 15, 2021, due to the team's success and after appearing in only eight games, the Suns assigned Smith to the Agua Caliente Clippers of the NBA G League. On February 26, 2021, the Suns recalled Smith. Smith ended his rookie season by making the NBA Finals, but the Suns were defeated in 6 games by the Milwaukee Bucks.

Indiana Pacers (2022–present) 
On February 10, 2022, Smith was traded to the Indiana Pacers along with a future second-round draft pick in exchange for Torrey Craig. Smith re-signed with the Pacers on a two-year deal worth $9.6 million dollars on July 1, 2022. After the signing, Pacers head coach Rick Carlisle announced Smith would be a starter and considered him an "important part of our future." On November 18, Smith posted a career-high 18 rebounds to go along with 10 points and 3 blocks in a win over the Houston Rockets. On November 27, Smith recorded a career-high 23 points on 8-14 shooting along with 9 rebounds in a loss to the Los Angeles Clippers. In December, Smith would be moved to the bench in favor of Aaron Nesmith, and would move in and out of the Pacers' rotation in the following months.

Career statistics

NBA

Regular season 

|-
| style="text-align:left;"| 
| style="text-align:left;"| Phoenix
| 27 || 1 || 5.8 || .440 || .235 || .714 || 1.4 || .1 || .0 || .2 || 2.0
|-
| style="text-align:left;"| 
| style="text-align:left;"| Phoenix
| 29 || 4 || 13.2 || .460 || .231 || .769 || 4.8 || .2 || .2 || .6 || 6.0
|-
| style="text-align:left;"| 
| style="text-align:left;"| Indiana
| 22 || 4 || 24.7 || .531 || .373 || .760 || 7.6 || .8 || .4 || 1.0 || 13.4
|- class="sortbottom"
| style="text-align:center;" colspan="2"| Career
| 78 || 9 || 13.9 || .495 || .317 || .761 || 4.4 || .4 || .2 || .6 || 6.7

Playoffs

|-
| style="text-align:left;"|2021
| style="text-align:left;"|Phoenix
| 6 || 0 || 3.0 || .500 || 1.000 || — || .8 || .2 || .0 || .0 || .8
|- class="sortbottom"
| colspan=2 style="text-align:center"|Career
| 6 || 0 || 3.0 || .500 || 1.000 || — || .8 || .2 || .0 || .0 || .8

College

|-
| style="text-align:left;"| 2018–19
| style="text-align:left;"| Maryland
| 33 || 33 || 26.7 || .492 || .268 || .658 || 6.8 || .9 || .4 || 1.2 || 11.7
|-
| style="text-align:left;"| 2019–20
| style="text-align:left;"| Maryland
| 31 || 31 || 31.3 || .538 || .368 || .750 || 10.5 || .8 || .7 || 2.4 || 15.5
|- class="sortbottom"
| style="text-align:center;" colspan="2"| Career
| 64 || 64 || 28.9 || .516 || .323 || .709 || 8.6 || .8 || .6 || 1.8 || 13.5

Personal life
His father, Charles, is a retired Navy Chief. Smith goes by the nickname, "Stix", though after bulking up for the 2019–20 season, he has been referred to as "Logs" by head coach Mark Turgeon.

References

External links

Maryland Terrapins bio
USA Basketball bio
Disciplined. Regimented. Focused. | Phoenix Suns

2000 births
Living people
20th-century African-American sportspeople
21st-century African-American sportspeople
African-American basketball players
Agua Caliente Clippers players
All-American college men's basketball players
American men's basketball players
Basketball players from Baltimore
Centers (basketball)
Indiana Pacers players
Maryland Terrapins men's basketball players
McDonald's High School All-Americans
Phoenix Suns draft picks
Phoenix Suns players
Power forwards (basketball)